Ezgi Dağdelenler (born , in Ankara) is a Turkish female volleyball player. She was part of the Turkey women's national volleyball team.

She participated in the 2012 FIVB Volleyball World Grand Prix.

References

External links
 Profile at FIVB.org

1993 births
Living people
Turkish women's volleyball players
People from Ankara
Aydın Büyükşehir Belediyespor volleyballers